Jarkko Okkonen is a Finnish professional football defender who currently plays in defence for the Veikkausliiga side JJK in Jyväskylä, Finland.

References

External links
  Profile at veikkausliiga.com

1978 births
Living people
Sportspeople from Oulu
Finnish footballers
FC Haka players
JJK Jyväskylä players
Veikkausliiga players
Association football defenders